Annik Shefrazian, known mononymously as Annik was an Iranian Armenian actress of film and television.

Biography 

Born in 1909 or 1910 in New Julfa, Isfahan. She followed the advice of her sister-in-law, a stage artist, to join theater groups and played bit parts with them touring Abadan, before landing her debut in Samuel Khachikian's The Stroke in 1964, she moved to Tehran and made acquaintance with Khachikian and Arman, and found her way into Armenian show groups. In 1968 Khachikian referred to her another role in The White Hell, which later led to winning character parts in veteran directors' films. Her films include The Coachman (Nosrat Karimi, 1971), Prince Ehtejab (Bahman Farmanara, 1974), The Chess of the Wind (Mohammadreza Asalni, 1977), The Crow (Bahram Bayzai, 1978) and Hamoun (Dariush Mehrjui, 1990). She won the Crystal Symorgh at Best Supporting Actress for her role in The Land of Dreams (Majid Qarizade) in 1988. She died at a nursing home in Kahrizak, Tehran in 1996.

Filmography
 The Stroke (1964)
 The White Hell (1968)
 The Coachman (1971)
 Prince Ehtejab (1974)
 The Crow or The Raven (1976 - aka Kalāq)
 The Chess Game of the Wind (1977)
 The Land of Dreams (1988)
 Hamoun (1990)

References

External links

1909 births
1910 births
1996 deaths
Actors from Isfahan
20th-century Iranian actresses
Iranian film actresses
Iranian television actresses
Ethnic Armenian actresses
Iranian people of Armenian descent
Crystal Simorgh for Best Supporting Actress winners